The 2004 Volta a la Comunitat Valenciana was the 62nd edition of the Volta a la Comunitat Valenciana road cycling stage race, which was held from 24 to 28 February 2004. The race started in Xàbia and finished in Valencia. The race was won by Alejandro Valverde of the  team.

General classification

References

Volta a la Comunitat Valenciana
2004 in road cycling
2004 in Spanish sport